Wish You Were Here is a humorous fantasy novel by English author Tom Holt.  It was first published in the U.K by Orbit Books in 1998.

Synopsis
A mischievous ghost tricks visitors into falling into Lake Chicopee, where — instead of drowning  — they receive what they were wishing for at the time of their accident.

Reception
At infinity plus, Nick Gifford stated that it had "super comic writing", which was reminiscent of Tom Sharpe, but faulted it for "mechanical" storytelling, with "protagonists (who) are too caricatured for any of their tribulations and transformations to really matter."

References

1998 British novels
English fantasy novels
British comedy novels
Novels set in Iowa
Novels by Tom Holt
Orbit Books books